Naushera is a village in Ujhani Tehsil and Budaun district, Uttar Pradesh, India. Its village code is 128284. It is 4 km away from Budaun railway station. As per the report of 2011 Census of India, The total population of the village is 3,259, where 53.10 are males and 46.9% are females. The village is administrated by Gram Panchayat.

References

Villages in Budaun district